Roldán Rodríguez Iglesias (born 9 November 1984 in Valladolid) is a Spanish racing driver, who competed in the GP2 Series from 2007 to 2009. Prior to this he competed in Spanish Formula Three and various Formula 3000 categories.

Career

Formula Three 
After competing in Formula Junior 1600 Spain in 2002, Rodríguez graduated to the Spanish Formula Three Championship in 2003 in remained there for the next four seasons, gradually improving to finish as series runner-up in 2006, behind Ricardo Risatti.

Nissan World Series 
In 2004, Rodríguez dovetailed part-time campaigns in F3 and the Nissan World Series, in which he scored two points from nine races.

Euroseries 3000 
Rodríguez drove for the Minardi Euroseries 3000 team in 2006 alongside his Spanish F3 campaign.

GP2 Series 
Giancarlo Minardi's team-up with Hitech/Piquet Sports for the 2007 GP2 Series season led to Rodríguez securing the second seat in the team, alongside Alexandre Negrão. He finished the season in 17th place.

After initially beginning 2008 without a GP2 drive, he replaced the injured Michael Herck at Fisichella Motor Sport for the last round of the GP2 Asia Series, then kept his seat with the team for the main 2008 GP2 Series season, replacing Andy Soucek who had been expected to fill the seat. He finished thirteenth in the championship, an improvement upon the previous year.

Rodríguez returned to Piquet GP to compete in the 2008–09 GP2 Asia Series season, where he finished third behind Kamui Kobayashi and Jérôme d'Ambrosio, and the 2009 GP2 Series season, where he finished eleventh.

Rodríguez rejoined Scuderia Coloni, the old Fisichella Motor Sport team, for the 2009–10 GP2 Asia Series season but was replaced by Alberto Valerio after the first round.

Formula One 
Rodríguez tested for Minardi during the  season at the circuit of Vallelunga (Italy).

He was signed by the Spyker Formula One team as a test driver for the winter of -. Rodriguez had a test with them in the middle of the season at Silverstone. During the 2008 pre-season, he was testing with Force India (former Spyker) to become an official driver, however Rodríguez was rejected in favor of Giancarlo Fisichella

He was linked with a race seat at Formula One newcomers Campos Grand Prix for 2010, but has announced that he will be taking a sabbatical from motorsport instead.

Racing record

Complete GP2 Series results 
(key) (Races in bold indicate pole position) (Races in italics indicate fastest lap)

Complete GP2 Asia Series results 
(key) (Races in bold indicate pole position) (Races in italics indicate fastest lap)

References 
Career statistics from driverdb.com, retrieved 4 March 2007.

External links 

 

1984 births
Living people
Sportspeople from Valladolid
Spanish racing drivers
Euroformula Open Championship drivers
International Formula 3000 drivers
World Series Formula V8 3.5 drivers
GP2 Series drivers
GP2 Asia Series drivers
International GT Open drivers
Piquet GP drivers
Scuderia Coloni drivers
Teo Martín Motorsport drivers
Campos Racing drivers